This is a list of songs in the music industry that have peaked at number-one on the Radio & Records singles chart. It was created in 1973, and monitored the most popular singles in terms of popular radio play that were based on and/or compiled from a panel consisting of Top 40/CHR stations in the United States (and Canada during the Radio & Records years from 1973 to 1994) that served as reporters.

Following the August 4, 2006 issue, Radio & Records was absorbed by competitor Billboard (and relaunched as R&R with the August 11, 2006 issue using the Nielsen BDS charts). After that date, the number-one singles come from Mediabase, which supplied Radio & Records with its chart data.

Radio & Records number-one singles

1970s

 List of Radio & Records number-one singles of the 1970s

1980s

 List of Radio & Records number-one singles of the 1980s

1990s

 List of Radio & Records number-one singles of the 1990s

2000s

 List of Radio & Records and Mediabase number-one singles of the 2000s

Mediabase number-one singles

2000s

 List of Radio & Records and Mediabase number-one singles of the 2000s

2010s

 List of Mediabase number-one singles of the 2010s

2020s 

 List of Mediabase number-one singles of the 2020s

See also
 List of Billboard number-one singles
 List of record charts

References

Radio